Hugh Malcolm Douglas Gurling (6 May 1950 – 2 November 2013) was an English medical geneticist who specialised in the role of genetics and mental health.  He led a molecular psychiatry laboratory at University College, London.

Gurling was born in London on 6 May 1950, and brought up in Derbyshire. His father, Kenneth Gurling, was a physician and inaugural dean of the University of Nottingham.  His mother, Nonie Sempill, was a nurse.

In 1987, he married Meryl Dahlitz, an academic neuropsychiatrist.  In 1994 they had their first daughter Holly, and then twins Laurel and Alisdair in 1998.

Death

Gurling died of a heart attack on 2 November 2013.

References

1950 births
2013 deaths
British geneticists
Academics of University College London
Alumni of King's College London
People educated at Sutton Valence School